Egevadluq Ragee (Eegivudluk, Eegyvudtuk, Egyvudlo, Eegeevadluk, Eegyvudluk, Eevudlook, Eegyvadluk) (1920–1983) was a Canadian artist, known primarily for her hand drawn prints and acrylics.

Career

Egevadluq Ragee’s interest in art began in 1959 while living in Tikerak when two other artists, Sheowak and Napatchie Pootoogook  encouraged her to start drawing. From there Ragee began creating her early works, which were often drawn with graphite pencil on paper. Her drawings primarily feature mythical creatures, bird-animal-human transformations and scenes of traditional life in the Inuit. As her art developed, Ragee began experimenting with new mediums including acrylics, pen and ink, printmaking and wax crayon.

Ragee’s drawing style has been recognized for its use of small, short strokes used to shade large spaces, which was uncommon for artists of this period. With this technique, Ragee could incorporate new textures into her artworks.  In addition to her drawings, by 1970 Ragee began painting with acrylics, making her one of the first Inuit in Cape Dorset to work with that medium.

Biography

Egevadluq Ragee was born on October 30, 1920 near Cape Dorset, in the small camp of Ikirasak in Nunavut.  Ragee lived with her parents, Pamiaktok and Sorisolutu until the birth of her sister when she began living with her grandparents in a nearby camp.

Ragee’s first marriage was to Kootoo with whom she had a son and daughter, the latter dying early in infancy.  Soon after their son’s death, Kootoo himself died from an undisclosed illness.

When Ragee’s daughter reached four years of age, she remarried to Sakkiassie and they adopted four children together. Originally living in Nuvudjuak, the couple eventually moved their family to Tikerak, a camp eight miles from Cape Dorset. In 1967, Ragee and her family moved again to Cape Dorset in response to the improved housing conditions. Ragee continued to live and work there until her death on June 26, 1983.

Honours and achievements

Ragee is one of several artists whose reproductions are presented in folios by Mintmark Press Special Editions (Toronto). She is one of three artists who contributed to a special folio of work, documented in the Cape Dorset Graphic annual catalogue of 1982. (1982 ‘Etchings Portfolio V: Timiat’)

In 1984 Egevadluq Ragee produced a folio of four prints, included in the Cape Dorset Graphic annual catalogue.

Ragee was one of several artists whose work was acquired and released by Norgraphics Limited between 1976 and 1984. The works that were selected are documented in the Cape Dorset Graphic annual catalogue of 1986.

Museum Collections
Ragee's work is held in the following collections:

Amon Carter Museum of Western Art, Fort Worth, Texas, U.S.A.
Art Gallery of Windsor, Windsor, Ontario
Art Gallery of York University, Downsview, Ontario
Canada Council Art Bank, Ottawa, Ontario
Canadian Guild of Crafts Quebec, Montreal, Quebec
Canadian Museum of Civilization, Hull, Quebec
Dennos Museum Center, Northwestern Michigan College, Traverse City, Michigan, U.S.A.
Department of External Affairs, Ottawa, Ontario
Glenbow Museum, Calgary, Alberta
Klamer Family Collection, Art Gallery of Ontario, Toronto, Ontario
Laurentian University Museum and Arts Centre, Sudbury, Ontario
McMaster University Art Gallery, Hamilton, Ontario
McMichael Canadian Art Collection, Kleinburg, Ontario
Musee des beaux-arts de Montreal, Montreal, Quebec
Museum of Anthropology, University of British Columbia, Vancouver, British Columbia
National Gallery of Canada, Ottawa, Ontario
Prince of Wales Northern Heritage Centre, Yellowknife, Northwest Territories
Red Deer and District Museum and Archives, Red Deer, Alberta
Royal Ontario Museum, Toronto, Ontario
Simon Fraser Gallery, Simon Fraser University, Burnaby, British Columbia
Teleglobe Canada, Montreal, Quebec
Toronto-Dominion Bank Collection, Toronto, Ontario
University of Alberta, Edmonton, Alberta
University of Lethbridge Art Gallery, Lethbridge, Alberta
University of New Brunswick, Fredericton, New Brunswick
Whyte Museum of the Canadian Rockies, Banff, Alberta
Winnipeg Art Gallery, Winnipeg, Manitoba

References

1920 births
1983 deaths
20th-century Canadian women artists
Inuit artists